Bellevue de l'Inini, also known as Mont Bellevue, Montagne Bellevue, and Montagne Bellevue de l'Inini, is the highest point of French Guiana,  an overseas department of France, with an elevation of 851 metres (2,792 ft).

See also
 Geography of French Guiana

External links
 

Bellevue de l'Inini
Highest points of French national parks
Maripasoula